It Began in the Rain (Finnish: Se alkoi sateessa) is a 1953 Finnish comedy thriller film directed by Thure Bahne and Eddie Stenberg and starring Eila Peitsalo, Tauno Palo and Kaarlo Halttunen. The film's sets were designed by Aarre Koivisto.

The production of the film was problematic. Eddie Stenberg was originally hired to direct the film, but in the middle of production the director was changed to Thure Bahne. It is known that producer T. J. Särkkä was also involved in completing the direction of the film. Särkkä later stated in his own words, that the film turned out to be "damn bad". In the evaluations of contemporary critics, it was generally stated that the change of makers has affected the final result of the film, and later in connection with the film's television premiere, it was assessed that "nothing works in the film, not the drama, not the characters, not to mention the directing."

Plot
The plot of the film is based on a misunderstanding. In a storm, a woman named Vuokko hits the smugglers' warehouse, where she meets the man she thinks is their boss. Through adventures, they finally end up at the altar, even though Vuokko has not known the man's true identity.

Cast
 Eila Peitsalo as Vuokko Takala  
 Tauno Palo as Captain Kalervo Karhi  
 Kaarlo Halttunen as Vuokko's uncle - Rural police chief 
 Annikki Arni 
 Matti Aulos as Pastor  
 Thure Bahne as Director  
 Greta Brotherus as herself  
 Mauno Enroth 
 Tyyne Haarla as Woman waiting for an elevator  
 Eva Hellas as Film star  
 Paavo Hukkinen as Station manager 
 Mauno Hyvönen 
 Ekke Hämäläinen
 Kurt Ingvall 
 Pentti Irjala as Police officer  
 Kalevi Kahra as Soldier  
 Eino Kaipainen as Chief Constable  
 Heikki Kalliokoski as Shadowing police officer  
 Aarno Karhilo as himself  
 Heikki Kataja as himself 
 Kaisa Kivitie as herself  
 Valma Kivitie as herself  
 Kauko Kokkonen as Rompan Eetu  
 Keijo Komppa as Smuggler  
 Arvo Kuusla as Police officer  
 Toivo Lahti as Gentleman  
 Varma Lahtinen as Kiosk vendor  
 Kauno Laine as Film crew member  
 Lennart Lauramaa as Police officer  
 Kauko Laurikainen as Police officer  
 Matti Lehtelä as Inspector  
 Heimo Lepistö as Lieutenant  
 Leevi Linko as Cop  
 Veikko Linna as Gentleman  
 Esko Mannermaa as Soldier  
 Uuno Montonen as Rural police chief of Hyrylä  
 Leo Nordberg as himself  
 Otto Noro as man in the train  
 Matti Oravisto as Film star  
 Esa Pakarinen as Third Mister  
 Martti Romppanen as Soldier  
 Vilho Ruuskanen as Station manager  
 Helmer Salmi as Antti  
 Mikko Sergejeff as Cinematographer  
 Paula Talaskivi as herself  
 Aimo Tepponen 
 Hannes Veivo as Cop  
 Pentti Viljanen as Farmer of Mattila  
 Urho Westman as Newspaper vendor  
 Eddie Stenberg as Liikkuva kylpyamme

References

Bibliography 
 Qvist, Per Olov & von Bagh, Peter. Guide to the Cinema of Sweden and Finland. Greenwood Publishing Group, 2000.

External links 
 

1953 films
1953 comedy films
Finnish comedy films
1950s Finnish-language films
Films directed by Eddie Stenberg
Finnish black-and-white films